Jadowniki  is a village in the administrative district of Gmina Pawłów, within Starachowice County, Świętokrzyskie Voivodeship, in south-central Poland.

The village has a population of 750.

History
In the Middle Ages, the village belonged to the Miechów monastery. (Jan Długosz Liber beneficiorum. T.III, 18).
In the nineteenth century, Jadowniki was described as a village and a manor farm, entailed in the Iłżecki poviat, Koniecek commune, and Świętomarz parish.
According to the 1827 census, there were 24 houses and 149 inhabitants.
According to the 1882 census, there were 46 houses, 270 inhabitants, 347 acres of manor land and 606 acres of peasants in the village.

References

Villages in Starachowice County